Balladonia is a small community in Western Australia (WA).

Balladonia may also refer to:

Plants
Balladonia (plant), a genus of plant of which some species were initially allocated to the genus Leucophyta
Eucalyptus fraseri, aka Balladonia gum, a species of eucalypt found in WA
Eucalyptus balladoniensis, aka Balladonia mallee, a species of eucalypt found in WA
Eucalyptus terebra, or Balladonia gimlet, a species of eucalypt found in WA

Other uses
Balladonia (horse), a British thoroughbred horse, dam of Wootton Bassett
Balladonia Land District, a cadastral division in Western Australia, in which the town is located
Balladonia Station, a pastoral lease near the town